Annapolis County is a county in the Canadian province of Nova Scotia located in the western part of the province located on the Bay of Fundy. The county seat is Annapolis Royal.

History
Established August 17, 1759, by Order in Council, Annapolis County took its name from the town of Annapolis Royal which had been named in honour of Anne, Queen of Great Britain. It was near the previous site of Port Royal, the chief Acadian settlement in the area. The Acadians had been forcibly removed by British government officials in the 1755 Grand Dérangement.

In 1817 the population of the county was 9,817, and that had grown to 14,661 by 1827. At that time, the county was divided into six townships: Annapolis, Granville, Wilmot, Clements, Digby and Clare.

By 1833, a number of reasons had been advanced for making two counties out of Annapolis County. Two petitions were presented to the House of Assembly in that year requesting that the county be divided. However, it was not until 1837 that Annapolis County was divided into two distinct and separate counties - Annapolis and Digby.

Demographics 

Population trend

Mother tongue language (2011)

Ethnic Groups (2006)

Communities

Towns
Annapolis Royal
Bridgetown
Middleton

Villages
Lawrencetown
Albany, Nova Scotia

Reserves
Bear River 6
Bear River 6B

County municipality and county subdivisions
Municipality of the County of Annapolis
Annapolis Subdivision A
Annapolis Subdivision B
Annapolis Subdivision C
Annapolis Subdivision D

Access routes
Highways and numbered routes that run through the county, including external routes that start or finish at the county limits:

Highways

Trunk Routes

Collector Routes:

External Routes:
None

Protected areas
Cottage Cove Provincial Park
Cloud Lake Wilderness Area 
Delaps Cove Hiking Trails
Kejimkujik National Park
Upper Clements Provincial Park
Valleyview Provincial Park

Attractions

Bay of Fundy Scenic Drive
Mount Hanley Schoolhouse Museum
Annapolis Royal Historic Gardens (Annapolis)
Fort Anne (Fort Anne National Historic Site)
Port-Royal National Historic Site
Upper Clements Park

See also
 List of municipalities in Nova Scotia
 Royal eponyms in Canada

References

External links
Photographs of historic monuments in Annapolis County

 
County municipalities in Nova Scotia
1759 establishments in the British Empire
States and territories established in 1759